Craig Karmazin (born July 11, 1975) is the founder and Chief Executive Officer of  Good Karma Brands (GKB), and the son of Mel Karmazin, former CEO of Sirius Satellite Radio and former CEO of Viacom.

Early life and education
Karmazin was born in northern New Jersey, the son of Sharon and Mel Karmazin. His father is the former chief operating officer of Sirius Satellite Radio and former president and chief operating officer of Viacom. His mother is the retired director of the East Brunswick Library and established the Karma Foundation in 1996 to provide grants in support of organizations engaged in activities and programs in the areas of Arts & Culture, Autism, Education & Literacy, Health & Human Services and Development & Enrichment of Jewish Life. His parents divorced in 1994. His first job was selling bikes at The Sports Authority. He graduated from Emory University with a B.B.A. He has one sister, Dina Leslie Karmazin Elkins (born 1971), and one daughter Harper Karmazin (born 2010).

Career
In 1997, Karmazin interned at Infinity-owned WIP in Philadelphia. In 1998, Karmazin founded Good Karma Broadcasting, a sports radio firm in Beaver Dam, Wisconsin, 40 miles northeast of Madison, Wisconsin. Karmazin liked the area due to its proximity to the University of Wisconsin campus as well as being in the heart of Green Bay Packer territory. In 1997, he secured a $3.5 million loan from a New York City bank and purchased three radio stations in the Madison area and then went on to purchase more stations in small towns: two in Wisconsin and one in Rockford, Illinois. He then entered larger markets purchasing a station West Palm Beach, Florida and two in Milwaukee, Wisconsin (WAUK, and formerly, WRRD), and affiliated those stations with ESPN Radio.

In 2006, he entered the Cleveland market simultaneously purchasing the gospel music station WABQ 1540 and the rights to the ESPN brand from sports talk station 850 WKNR, reformatting WABQ as a sports station. A short time later, he purchased WKNR. The net cost for both stations was $9.5 million. As of 2012, Good Karma Broadcasting owns twelve radio stations in four states including eight ESPN-affiliated, sports radio stations. In 2012, Good Karma expanded its operations opening three remodeled houses near Lambeau Field in Green Bay to entertain clients and fans as well as a Verizon Wireless store in Beaver Dam.

On July 16, 2014, it was reported that Karmazin purchased a minority stake in the Milwaukee Bucks of the National Basketball Association (NBA). Karmazin purchased the flagship station of the Packers and Brewers, WTMJ Radio, along with WKTI in the fall of 2018 from the E. W. Scripps Company, converting WKTI to a local sports station affiliated with ESPN Radio, with WAUK moving to a national schedule (WTMJ's schedule has remained as-is).

Awards and honors
 2021 NBA Champion (as part owner of the Milwaukee Bucks)

References

1975 births
American chief executives
20th-century American Jews
Emory University alumni
Living people
People from Fox Point, Wisconsin
21st-century American Jews